was a district located in Toyama Prefecture, Japan.

As of November 1, 2004, the district had a population of 13,770. The total area was 58.76 km2.

Towns
Prior to dissolution, the district had only one town left:

 Fukuoka

History
Due to the enforcement of the district government, the district was founded in 1896 when the former Tonami District, occupied the southwestern Etchū Province, split into Nishitonami and Higashitonami Districts.

The district covered all of the city of Oyabe, and the areas of Toide, Fukuoka, and Tatsuno in the city of Takaoka. The district seat was located at the town of Ishido (now the city of Oyabe).

District Timeline
 In 1962 - The towns of Ishido and Tochu merged to become the city of Oyabe.
 On November 1, 2004 - The town of Fukumitsu was merged with the towns of Fukuno, Inami and Jōhana, and the villages of Inokuchi, Kamitaira, Taira and Toga (all from Higashitonami District) to create the city of Nanto.
 On November 1, 2005 - The town of Fukuoka was merged into the expanded city of Takaoka. Nishitonami District was dissolved as a result of this merger.

See also
 List of dissolved districts of Japan

Former districts of Toyama Prefecture